Ctětín is a municipality and village in Chrudim District in the Pardubice Region of the Czech Republic. It has about 200 inhabitants.

Administrative parts
Villages of Bratroňov, Strkov and Vranov are administrative parts of Ctětín.

References

External links

Villages in Chrudim District